Zuma and Trancas Canyons are an area of Federal parkland to the west of Malibu, California. It lies within the Santa Monica Mountains National Recreation Area and is the largest piece of Federal parkland in the NRA.
Zuma Canyon contains a number of trails for hikers, of varying severity, and is the home of a range of wildlife, including the wrentit, known as the "Voice of the Chaparral". 
The park's eastern boundary is marked by Kanan Dume Road (county route N-9) and the north end of the parkland is crossed by the Backbone Trail, a 67 mile pathway through the Santa Monica Mountains.The name zuma is derived from a Chumash word meaning "abundance".

References

Santa Monica Mountains National Recreation Area
Parks in Los Angeles County, California